Estuaire is the most populous of Gabon's nine provinces. It covers an area of 20,740 km. The provincial capital is Libreville, which is also Gabon's national capital. The province is named for the Gabon Estuary, which lies at the heart of the province.

Estuaire is at the northwestern corner of Gabon, its western edge as the shores of the Gulf of Guinea. To the north, Estuaire borders the Republic of Equatorial Guinea: the Litoral Province in the northwest, and the Centro Sur Province in the northeast. Domestically, it borders the following provinces:
Woleu-Ntem – east
Moyen-Ogooué – south-southeast
Ogooué-Maritime – southwest

Departments
Estuaire is divided into 6 departments:
Komo Department (Kango)
Komo-Mondah Department (Ntoum)
Noya Department (Cocobeach)
Cap Estérias Department (Cap Estérias)
Komo-Océan Department (Ndzomoe)
Libreville (department & capital city)

References

External links
Statoids, Departments of Gabon

 
Provinces of Gabon